CFCF-DT (channel 12) is a television station in Montreal, Quebec, Canada, part of the CTV Television Network. It is owned and operated by network parent Bell Media alongside Noovo flagship CFJP-DT (channel 35). Both stations share studios at the Bell Media building (formerly the Montréal Téléport), at the intersection of Avenue Papineau and Boulevard René-Lévesque Est in downtown Montreal, while CFCF-DT's transmitter is located atop Mount Royal.

History

Canadian Marconi Company (1961–1972)
CFCF-TV was founded by the Canadian Marconi Company, owner of CFCF radio (600 AM, later CINW on 940 AM before its closure in 2010; and 106.5 FM, now CKBE-FM at 92.5), after several failed attempts to gain a licence, beginning in 1938, and then each year after World War II. In 1960, it finally gained a licence, and began broadcasting on January 20, 1961 at 5:45 p.m. It was the second privately owned English language station in Quebec; CKMI-TV in Quebec City had signed on four years earlier in March 1957.

The station was originally located above the Avon Theatre. The first night on-air was fraught with problems. A power failure interrupted the opening ceremony, and later on, police raided the downstairs ballroom, with sirens blazing and a number of arrests made. The station's newscast, Pulse News, faced a few problems because of the noise from the ballroom. CFCF-AM-FM-TV moved into their own facilities at 405 Ogilvy Avenue in Montreal's Park Extension neighbourhood on May 19.

Channel 12 joined CTV as a charter affiliate on October 1, 1961. However, despite its status as CTV's second-largest affiliate, its relationship with CTV was somewhat acrimonious over the years. Canadian Marconi, as would channel 12's numerous owners over the years, felt CTV's flagship station, CFTO-TV in Toronto, had too much influence over the network.

Multiple Access (1972–1979)
In 1968, the Canadian Radio-television and Telecommunications Commission (CRTC) required that all broadcasting outlets be 80% Canadian owned. Canadian Marconi was a subsidiary of the UK-based General Electric Company plc, and was forced to put its entire broadcasting division—CFCF-TV, CFCF (AM), CFQR-FM and CFCX—on the market. A deal to sell the stations to Ernie Bushnell, owner of CJOH-TV in Ottawa, collapsed in the spring of 1971 when Bushnell was unable to secure the necessary financing. Later in 1971, Canadian Marconi agreed to sell the stations to computer and telecommunications company Multiple Access Ltd., owned by the Bronfman family. In so doing, Canadian Marconi earned a handsome return on its original investment in CFCF, which long claimed to be the oldest radio station in Canada.

Multiple Access bought the stations after the CRTC refused to approve purchase offers by Baton Broadcasting, owner of CFTO (other CTV partners opposed the sale, and Baton was not interested in buying the radio stations without channel 12 being included in the purchase), and by CHUM Limited (because of indecision over which radio stations would be sold to meet radio ownership limits in Montreal). Multiple Access also was co-owner of CITY-TV in Toronto (with CHUM) during this time (both Baton and CHUM-CITY, minus CHUM's television stations, became CTVglobemedia, which was later in turn became Bell Media, the current owner of CTV and CFCF).

CFCF Inc. (1979–1992)
In 1979, Multiple Access sold the stations and its production company, Champlain Productions, to CFCF Inc., headed by Jean Pouliot. This came after a deal by Baton (this time a willing partner) to purchase Multiple Access' Montreal broadcasting operations fell through. CHUM successfully purchased Multiple Access' Toronto operations (its share of CITY-TV). Later on, the station began broadcasting a 24-hour schedule full of classic television shows and movies during the late night hours, because of the popularity of VHS and Betamax VCRs by that time. As of the present day, the station now airs mostly infomercials in late night.

CFCF Inc., expanded to include the assets of CF Cable TV, which was acquired by Pouliot in 1982, and went public in 1985. In 1986, CFCF gained a sister station: CFJP-TV, the flagship station of Pouliot's new French language network, Television Quatre-Saisons (TQS); now known as Noovo. TQS spent most of its early years in serious financial difficulty; the revenues from channel 12 were all that kept it afloat. Two years later, the radio stations were sold to Mount-Royal Broadcasting, and moved out of the CFCF building a year later. 1986 also saw CFCF become the home base for a Canadian game show: The New Chain Reaction was taped there, as was the French counterpart, Action Réaction. Chain was initially hosted by Canadian musician Blake Emmons, but he quit after only a few weeks. Producer Bob Stewart then brought in Geoff Edwards to replace him; in turn, CFCF staff announcer Rod Charlebois was then given an on-air role, to satisfy CanCon requirements. This version ran until 1991 on Global in Canada and in America on the USA Network.

Canwest Global and Videotron (1992–1997)
Financial relief came to the company in the 1990s with an investment from Canwest Global Communications. In return, CFCF did not stand in the way of Canwest's plans to apply for a Global repeater station in Montreal. However, Canwest Global changed its mind, citing tax problems. It did, however, allow CFCF to carry some Global programs; it was already airing some programming from Citytv. This would not be the end of Global's influence at the station.

In 1997, TVA sold controlling interest in CKMI to Canwest. The two companies announced plans to turn CKMI into a Global station, along with a CKMI repeater in Montreal and a large studio complex in Montreal. Pouliot was scared by the prospect of new competition and decided to get out. He initially planned to sell CFCF to Vidéotron. However, Vidéotron also owned TVA, which retained a 49 percent stake in CKMI. This would have resulted in one company having a significant stake in all of the private stations in Montreal – CFCF, CKMI, CFJP and TVA flagship CFTM-TV.

Vidéotron knew that the CRTC would never approve such an arrangement, so it sold CFCF to Western International Communications (WIC), who also owned CHAN-TV and CHEK-TV in British Columbia, CHCH-TV in Ontario and several stations in Alberta. Over the next few years, CFCF cut back its carriage of CTV programming to little more than the base schedule of 40 hours per week. This was due to longstanding tensions between WIC and CTV (stemming from similar issues to those raised by CFCF, in that they felt CFTO and Baton had too much influence over the network); the station filled out the rest of their schedule with WIC's own library of programming. This didn't pose a problem at first, since Ottawa's CJOH was available on cable in Montreal for most of the 1980s and 1990s; CJOH operates a repeater in Cornwall, Ontario whose footprint reaches Montreal. Meanwhile, TQS was sold to Quebecor, and later to Cogeco and Bell Globemedia (which later became CTVglobemedia and is now known as Bell Media).

Before 1997, when CHCH and CITY launched rebroadcast transmitters in the Ottawa region, local cable companies there carried CFCF as well. Because CHCH and CFCF were sharing some programs, CFCF was removed from these systems, except for Rogers Cable. Also around this time, CJOH was dropped from Montreal cable systems after its owner, Baton, bought controlling interest in CTV.

CTV (2001–present)

Canwest bought WIC's television assets in 2000. However, the CRTC did not allow Canwest to twinstick CFCF with CKMI. The commission believed that the Montreal region's anglophone population was too small to allow a twinstick of the city's private anglophone stations. It did, however, allow Canwest to keep CJNT-TV, a multicultural station WIC had bought a year earlier. CFCF was placed under trusteeship, and had to be sold in short order. In 2001, amid all these wranglings over ownership, Bell Globemedia, owner of CTV, bought the station. After 40 years of being master of its own house to a large degree, CFCF lost much of that independence and maneuverability through the CTV/Bell Globemedia deal.

With the opening of the Fall 2001 television season, CFCF officially adopted the full CTV schedule. The newscast dropped its longtime Pulse title in favour of the generic CFCF News. However, the Pulse brand was so firmly established that viewers still call the newscasts by that title today. The station also adopted a new golden call letter logo similar to all other CTV owned stations, as well as similar promo and newscast graphics.

In 2003, CFCF moved to a studio on Papineau Avenue in the eastern part of downtown, and the master control operations were moved to 9 Channel Nine Court in Toronto, the home of CTV flagship CFTO. By this situation, CFCF overtook Vancouver's CIVT-TV to become the largest market with a CTV O&O station whose studios were located in a downtown area (Toronto's CFTO-TV/DT had operated in the same 9 Channel Nine Court studios since its inception). The area has now become Montreal's (and French Canada's) main media district; the studio facilities of CBC Television/Ici Radio-Canada Télé, Télé-Québec, RDS and TVA are all within several blocks.

On October 3, 2005, the station dropped the use of its call letters on-air, instead branding as simply "CTV", with the newscast becoming CTV News. This type of rebranding was instituted at all affiliates across the country to provide a common brand for the entire network.

By 2005, Bell Globemedia was considered to be a non-core asset by parent company Bell Canada Enterprises and was sold to a group of investors, which included the Thomson family. The Bell Globemedia group (made up of the entire CTV network, as well as The Globe and Mail newspaper and a variety of other channels and media assets) was renamed CTVglobemedia in late 2006. In April 2011, BCE re-acquired full ownership of CTVglobemedia and changed the new division's name to Bell Media. The new media giant also acquired CHUM Limited's holdings in 2006, including the A-Channel stations, MuchMusic and a variety of other specialty channels. But the CHUM deal also raised serious questions about the high degree of media concentration in Canada. This new conglomerate owned more than one television station in several Canadian markets – increasing the worry about job losses and cutbacks.

In 2009, CFCF discontinued the Telethon of Stars that aired during the first weekend of December, consecutively, for 32 years from 1977 to 2009; the removal of the telethon from the station was due to budget cuts made by CTV as a result of the economic crisis. In December 2010, the Telethon of Stars could only be seen through the Internet (via an 8-hour webcast), with no television equivalent broadcast. It was dropped entirely shortly thereafter.

Haugland was the son of Canadian journalist and retired former television news anchor for CFCF-TV in Montreal, Bill Haugland. The other person killed in the crash was Roger Belanger, a veteran pilot and local businessman who was in his 60s.

Programming
CFCF has always been the highest-rated television station for Anglophone Quebecers. As well, a significant number of bilingual Francophones also watch CFCF – for both programming and news – although CFTM, CFJP and CBFT-DT (Radio-Canada) are the obvious market leaders for Quebec's French community.

The station now airs all of the standard CTV schedule. CFCF's schedule is now identical to CFTO – the only difference being its afternoon talk programs from 3:00 to 6:00 p.m. CFCF scheduled its programming around the schedules of Burlington, Vermont–Plattsburgh, New York stations for simultaneous substitution purposes, with Anderson Live at 3:00 p.m. (simsubbing WPTZ), The Ellen DeGeneres Show at 4:00 p.m. (simsubbing WCAX-TV) and The Dr. Oz Show at 5:00 p.m. (simsubbing WVNY). In contrast, CFTO broadcasts Dr. Phil at 3:00 p.m. (locally simsubbing WGRZ), Ellen at 4:00 p.m. (also simsubbing WGRZ) and Anderson Live at 5:00 p.m. (the only non-simsubbed program, not broadcast at that time by any Buffalo station).

As with most CTV-affiliated stations, CFCF's prime-time network schedule is usually synchronized with the original American airings of the same programs because all major stations serving the Burlington–Plattsburgh area—WCAX, the CBS affiliate; WPTZ, the NBC affiliate; WVNY, the ABC affiliate; and WFFF-TV, the Fox affiliate—are available on cable in Montreal and CFCF is likewise available on cable in the Burlington–Plattsburgh area. CFCF's ratings do generally top all of those stations, as well as CBMT-DT, the local CBC station.

In the past, some children's programming was preempted, because of provincial regulations on advertising; the station now carries CTV's few remaining children's programs with public service announcements during ad breaks. As well, CFCF did not carry either Wheel of Fortune or Jeopardy! when these were part of the standard CTV schedule; both were picked up by the CBC nationally in the fall of 2008, only for them to be discarded in the fall of 2011.

Most recently, the station began airing promos for Bell Media's secondary television system, CTV 2, despite the fact that CTV 2 stations are only available on cable and satellite, with no Quebec affiliates.

News operation
CFCF-DT presently broadcasts 20½ hours of locally produced newscasts each week (with 3½ hours each weekday and 1½ hours each on Saturdays and Sundays). The station's studios in Downtown Montreal also house the CTV News network division's Montreal news bureau.

Since 1986, one of CFCF's lead evening anchors has been Mutsumi Takahashi. Amanda Kline is the current lead anchor of the weekend edition and Maya Johnson anchors the 5 and 11:30 p.m. bulletins. One of its most famous anchors, Bill Haugland, is now retired; his last newscast aired on November 30, 2006. Haugland worked at CFCF for more than 40 years. He covered major stories in the 1960s and 1970s before becoming the lead anchor at CFCF in the late-1970s. Haugland was an institution and in a special "Farewell to Bill" show broadcast on his final day, he was heralded by colleagues, viewers and former prime ministers alike. In December 2006, Haugland was replaced by another CFCF veteran newscaster, Brian Britt. Britt too retired on July 24, 2008, and was then fully replaced by Todd van der Heyden up until the end of 2011. Currently, Mutsumi Takahashi is station's sole anchor for 6 p.m. evening broadcasts, as Bell Media eliminated the co-anchor position due to cost-cutting measures.

Until March 10, 2009, CFCF aired a weekday morning newscast at 6 a.m. called First News, which pre-empted the first half hour of Canada AM; anchored by Herb Luft, it was cancelled in favor of an early start time for Canada AM, which was then seen in its entirety starting at 6 a.m. Morning news briefs seen during Canada AM were also cancelled. Luft would continue his role as reporter for the station, until retiring in June 2010. These cancellations were part of continuing cutbacks made by CTV due to the economic crisis.

On May 11, 2011, it was announced that longtime 11:30 p.m. news anchor Debra Arbec had left the station to become the main anchor at CBC O&O CBMT-DT. Various other anchors filled in the void for the remainder of May and then June 2011. CTV reporter/former CJAD and CJFM news announcer Catherine Sherriffs became Arbec's permanent replacement on July 4, 2011.

On December 2, 2011, Todd van der Heyden announced he would step down at the end of the month to become an anchor at CTV News Channel in Toronto. Beginning in 2012, weekend anchor Karwatsky was appointed as interim anchor to replace Van der Heyden while a permanent anchor was found. During the evening, on January 18, 2012, it was made official that Karwatsky would occupy the permanent co-anchor position.

On July 29, 2014, several layoffs were announced by CTV Montreal's general manager. Among them was Catherine Sherriffs, who at the time was on maternity leave, and was told her job anchoring the 11:30 p.m. newscast was no more. Instead, Paul Karwatsky, already co-anchoring the 6 p.m. and occasionally the 11:30 p.m. news, took over as anchor for the 11:30 p.m. spot permanently.

On June 20, 2017, local sportscast programming was cancelled, resulting in the immediate layoff of the entire sports department, which included long-time anchor Randy Tieman, reporter Brian Wilde and weekend anchor Sean Coleman. (a dedicated sports department had been part of CFCF-12 since its inception, and once even included noted and retired hockey broadcaster, Dick Irvin; For 30 years, between 1961 to 1991, Irvin had been a longtime veteran sports director and anchor at the station).

On November 14, 2017, long-time executive producer Barry Wilson, best known for his Postscript editorial, was laid off as part of Bell Media's ongoing cost-cutting measures.

On January 2020, news reporter and weekend anchor Annie DeMelt left CTV to join the MUHC Communications team.

On September 4, 2020, news anchor Paul Karwatsky left CTV, with Caroline Van Vlaardingen filling the spot interim. It was announced on November 9 that Maya Johnson would take over as anchor for the 5 p.m. and 11:30 p.m. news.

On February 1, 2021, as part of Bell Media's ongoing cost-cutting, it announced the elimination of its Quebec City reporter position.

On June 2, 2022, long-time news director Jed Kahane was laid off as part of Bell Media's ongoing cost-cutting measures.

Digital television and high definition

Subchannel

Analogue-to-digital conversion

The station began providing a high definition feed to Videotron and Bell Fibe on December 1, 2009, and in September 2010 respectively. Its digital signal signed on over-the-air on temporary pre-transition UHF channel 51 on January 28, 2011.

On August 31, 2011, when Canadian television stations in CRTC-designated mandatory markets transitioned from analogue to digital broadcasts, the station relocated its digital signal from channel 51 to VHF channel 12. The shutdown of its analog signal and temporary digital transmitter occurred just after its 11:30 p.m. newscast that evening.

References

External links
Official website

 CFCF at TV Hat

FCF-DT
FCF-DT
Television channels and stations established in 1961
English-language mass media in Quebec
1961 establishments in Quebec